Natalia Molina is an American historian and Distinguished Professor of American Studies and Ethnicity at the University of Southern California. She is the author of Fit To Be Citizens? Public Health and Race in Los Angeles, 1879-1939, How Race Is Made in America: Immigration, Citizenship, and the Historical Power of Racial Scripts, and A Place at the Nayarit: How a Mexican Restaurant Nourished a Community. In 2019, Molina co-edited a series of essays on the formation of race in the United States, Relational Formations of Race: Theory, Method, and Practice, in collaboration with Daniel Martínez Hosang and Ramón Gutiérrez. She has also published numerous articles in scholarly journals and contributes op-eds in nationally circulated newspapers. She received a 2020 MacArthur Fellowship for her work on race and citizenship. Molina is currently serving as the Interim Director of Research at The Huntington Library.

Education and employment 
Molina received her B.A. from the University of California, Los Angeles and double-majored in History and Women's Studies. She later received and her M.A. and Ph.D. from the University of Michigan, after which she joined the University of California, San Diego faculty. After earning tenure and serving in various faculty and administrative roles at UCSD, in 2018 she joined the faculty of the Department of American Studies and Ethnicity at the University of Southern California in 2018.

Research 
Molina studies the intersections of race, gender, culture, and citizenship. Her scholarship has been described as "an exciting contribution to the growing body of scholarship that knits the history of medicine and public health more tightly into the fabric of the American past..." and as making an “important contribution to the literature on the histories of public health, race, labor, and urban planning by demonstrating the magnitude of public health officials‘ influence on city policy and planning and on the development of racial hierarchies”. In 2007, Molina won the PCB-American Historical Association's Norris and Carol Hundley Award for her first book, Fit to be Citizens? Public Health and Race in Los Angeles, 1879–1939.

Fit to Be Citizens?: Public Health and Race in Los Angeles, 1879-1940 (2006)

How Race Is Made in America (2013) 
Molina's 2013 book How Race Is Made in America: Immigration, Citizenship, and the Historical Power of Racial Scripts examines Mexican immigration to the United States. Focusing on the years between 1924-1965, Molina argues that during this time period an immigration regime emerged that would define racial categories in the U.S., such as Mexican American, that persist in current perceptions of race and ethnicity. How Race Is Made in America  shows how racial scripts are easily adopted and adapted to apply to different racial groups. The book's argument connects the experiences of different racialized groups by showing how and when they intersect as racial categories are constituted in American society.

Relational Formations of Race: Theory, Method, and Practice (Co-editor, 2019)

A Place at the Nayarit: How a Mexican Restaurant Nourished a Community (2022) 
Molina's 2022 book A Place at the Nayarit: How a Mexican Restaurant Nourished a Community, offers a history of the Nayarit, a Mexican restaurant in Echo Park formerly owned by her grandmother, Doña Natalia Barraza. The restaurant's original location was near Boyle Heights, although it relocated to Echo Park in 1951. In this work, Molina demonstrates that working people and ethnic Mexican residents in Los Angeles fundamentally shaped public spaces in the urban landscape. She further asserts that restaurants can "serve as social spaces that shape the neighborhoods in which they are located."

Molina will donate all 2022 proceeds from the book to No Us Without You, a 501c3 organization which offers food security resources to undocumented immigrants in the greater Los Angeles area.

Forthcoming Work: The Silent Hands that Shaped the Huntington: A History of Its Mexican Workers

Recognition 

In October 2020, Molina received a 2020 MacArthur Fellowship. The citation noted her work connecting historical racial narratives about immigration to current policy debates.

Awards 
 2007: PCB-American Historical Association's Norris and Carol Hundley Award
 2020: MacArthur Foundation "Genius Grant" Fellowship

Selected works 
 Fit To Be Citizens? Public Health and Race in Los Angeles, 1879-1939. University of California Press, 2006
 How Race Is Made in America: Immigration, Citizenship, and the Historical Power of Racial Scripts, University of California Press, 2013

References 

Living people
American women historians
21st-century American women writers
21st-century American historians
MacArthur Fellows
University of Southern California faculty
University of California, Los Angeles alumni
University of Michigan alumni
Year of birth missing (living people)
Historians from California